The Women University Multan (WUM), is a public university located in Multan, Punjab, Pakistan.

Recognized university
This is a recognized university by the Higher Education Commission of Pakistan.

Programs
Women University Multan offers undergraduate and postgraduate programs in the following disciplines:

Arts and Humanities
English
Mathematics
Urdu
Islamiyat

Business and Social Sciences
Economics
Business Administration
Psychology
Sociology

Science and Technology
Statistics
Computer Science
Information Technology
Chemistry
Physics

See also
 University of Sahiwal
 Government College Women University, Faisalabad
 Government College Women University, Sialkot
 University of Okara
 Government Sadiq College Women University, Bahawalpur

References

External links

Educational institutions established in 2013
Women's universities and colleges in Pakistan
2013 establishments in Pakistan
Public universities and colleges in Punjab, Pakistan
Universities and colleges in Multan